Dustin Brown was the defending champion, but was nominated for Germany Davis Cup team this year.

Seeds

Draw

Finals

Top half

Bottom half

References
 Main Draw
 Qualifying Draw

Pekao Szczecin Open - Singles
2015 Singles
2015 in Polish tennis